Greater Mekong Subregion (GMS) Environment Operations Center (EOC) was established in early 2006 to serve as the information and knowledge clearing house for environmental management in the Greater Mekong Subregion (GMS) and is responsible for facilitating the timely and effective implementation of the GMS Core Environment Program (CEP). EOC will also act as a secretariatto the Working Group on Environment (WGE), taking over the support functions, such as organizing and holding WGE meetings, coordinating WGE activities, reporting to the WGE, and other tasks which were previously carried out by the Asian Development Bank (ADB).

Components
The GMS Core Environment Program (CEP) has 5 components: 
 Component 1. Strategic Environmental Assessments (SEAs) of GMS Economic Corridors and Priority Sectors
 Component 2. Biodiversity Conservation Corridors Initiative (BCI)
 Component 3. Environmental Performance Assessments (EPAs)
 Component 4. Capacity Building for Environmental Management
 Component 5. Program Development, Delivery and Sustainable Financing

External links
Official GMS Environment Operations Center website
GMS Environment Operations Center at Asian Development Bank
"GMS Environment Ministers Seek Added Funds to Combat Climate Change" article at Port of Entry,  Jan 2008

Greater Mekong Subregion
Environment of Southeast Asia
International economic organizations
International environmental organizations
Environmental organizations based in China